The following is a list of episodes from the Virgin 1 television series, Virgin 1 Presents.....

Seasons

Season 1
The first season's episodes begin airing on Saturday 17 November 2007.

The original UK airdates are listed here for each episode.

Future Episodes
Future episodes include musician Robyn Hitchcock.

Lists of British non-fiction television series episodes